St. John's Episcopal Church, or variants thereof, can refer to the following:

United States
(by state then city)
 St. John's Episcopal Church (Montgomery, Alabama), listed on the National Register of Historic Places (NRHP) in Montgomery County
 St. John's Episcopal Church (Globe, Arizona), NRHP-listed in Gila County
 St. John's Episcopal Church (Camden, Arkansas)
 St. John's Episcopal Church (Chico, California), NRHP-listed in Butte County
 St. John's Cathedral (Los Angeles), California, NRHP-listed in Los Angeles County
 Saint John's Episcopal Church (Wilmington, California)
 St. John's Episcopal Church (Bridgeport, Connecticut), NRHP-listed in Fairfield County
 St. John's Episcopal Church (East Hartford, Connecticut), NRHP-listed in Hartford County
 St. John's Episcopal Church (Hartford, Connecticut)
 St. John's Protestant Episcopal Church (Stamford, Connecticut), NRHP-listed in Fairfield County
 St. John's Episcopal Church (Warehouse Point, Connecticut) (East Windsor), NRHP-listed in Hartford County
 St. John's Episcopal Church (West Hartford, Connecticut)
 St. John's Cathedral (Jacksonville), Florida
 St. John's Episcopal Church (Tallahassee, Florida), NRHP-listed in Leon County
 St. John's Episcopal Church (Moultrie, Georgia)
 St. John's Episcopal Church (American Falls, Idaho), NRHP-listed in Power County
 St. John's Episcopal Church (Albion, Illinois), NRHP-listed in Edwards County
 Saint John's Episcopal Church (Crawfordsville, Indiana), NRHP-listed in Montgomery County
 St. John's Episcopal Church (Lafayette, Indiana), NRHP-listed in Tippecanoe County
 St. John's Episcopal Church (Dubuque, Iowa), contributing property on the NRHP in Lee County
 St. John's Episcopal Church (Keokuk, Iowa), NRHP-listed in Dubuque County
 St. John's Episcopal Church (Abilene, Kansas), NRHP-listed in Dickinson County
 St. John's Episcopal Church (Girard, Kansas), NRHP-listed in Crawford County
 St. John's Episcopal Church (Laurel Hill, Louisiana), NRHP-listed in West Feliciana Parish
 St. John's Episcopal Church and Cemetery, Thibodaux, Louisiana, NRHP-listed in Lafourche Parish
 St. John's Episcopal Church (Dresden Mills, Maine), NRHP-listed in Lincoln County
 St. John's Episcopal Church (Baltimore, Maryland)
 St. John's Episcopal Church, Zion Parish, in Beltsville, Maryland
 St. John's Episcopal Church (Ellicott City, Maryland)
 St. John's Episcopal Church (Fort Washington, Maryland), historic congregation formerly called Broad Creek
 Saint John's Church (Hagerstown, Maryland)
 St. John's Episcopal Church (Framingham, Massachusetts), NRHP-listed in Middlesex County
 St. John's Episcopal Church (Detroit), NRHP-listed in Wayne County, Michigan
 St. John's Episcopal Church (Mount Pleasant, Michigan), NRHP-listed in Isabella County
 St. John's Episcopal Church (Saginaw, Michigan), NRHP-listed in Saginaw County
 Saint John's Episcopal Church (Ocean Springs, Mississippi), NRHP-listed in Jackson County
 St. John's Episcopal Church (Eolia, Missouri), NRHP-listed in Pike County
 St. John's Episcopal Church (Springfield, Missouri)
 St. John's Episcopal Church (Butte, Montana)
 St. John's Church (Portsmouth, New Hampshire), NRHP-listed in Rockingham County
 St. John's Episcopal Church (Boonton, New Jersey), designed by Richard Upjohn
 St. John's Episcopal Church (Elizabeth, New Jersey)
 St. John's Episcopal Church (Jersey City, New Jersey)
 St. John's Episcopal Church (Little Silver, New Jersey), NRHP-listed in Monmouth County
 St. John's Episcopal Church and Burying Ground, Runnymede, New Jersey, NRHP-listed in Camden County
 St. John's Episcopal Church, Boquet Chapel, New York, original name of Foothills Baptist Church (Essex, New York), NRHP-listed in Essex County
 St. John's Episcopal Church (Cape Vincent, New York), NRHP-listed in Jefferson County
 St. John's Episcopal Church (Clifton Springs, New York)
 St. John's Church Complex (Delhi, New York), NRHP-listed in Delaware County
 St. John's Episcopal Church (Honeoye Falls, New York), NRHP-listed in Monroe County
 St. John's Episcopal Church (Johnstown, New York), NRHP-listed in Fulton County
 St. John's Episcopal Church and Rectory (Monticello, New York), NRHP-listed in Sullivan County
 St. John's Episcopal Church (Mount Morris, New York), NRHP-listed in Livingston County
 St. Johns Episcopal Church and Cemetery (Oakdale, New York), NRHP-listed in Suffolk County
 St. John's Episcopal Church, Canandaigua, Ontario County, New York
 St. John's Episcopal Church (Phelps, New York), NRHP-listed in Ontario County
 St. John's Episcopal Church (Phoenix, New York), NRHP-listed in Oswego County
 St. John's Episcopal Church (Pleasantville, New York), NRHP-listed in Westchester County
 St. John's Episcopal Church (Speedsville, New York), NRHP-listed in Tompkins County
 St. John's Protestant Episcopal Church (Yonkers, New York)
 St. John's Episcopal Church (Youngstown, New York), NRHP-listed in Niagara County
 St. John's Episcopal Church (Battleboro, North Carolina), a property NRHP-listed in Edgecombe County
 St. John's Episcopal Church (Fayetteville, North Carolina), NRHP-listed in Cumberland County
 St. John's Episcopal Church (Marion, North Carolina), NRHP-listed in McDowell County
 St. John's Episcopal Church (St. John's, North Carolina), NRHP-listed in Pitt County
 St. John's Episcopal Church (Williamsboro, North Carolina), NRHP-listed in Vance County
 St. John's Episcopal Church (Cleveland, Ohio), NRHP-listed in Cuyahoga County
 St. John's Episcopal Church (Worthington, Ohio), NRHP-listed in Franklin County
 St. John's Episcopal Church (Youngstown, Ohio), NRHP-listed in Mahoning County
 St. John's Episcopal Church (Portland, Oregon), NRHP-listed in Multnomah County
 St. John's Episcopal Church (Toledo, Oregon), NRHP-listed in Lincoln County
 St. John's Church (Concord, Pennsylvania)
 St. John's Episcopal Church (Ashwood, Tennessee), NRHP-listed in Maury County
 St. John's Episcopal Church (Highgate Falls, Vermont), NRHP-listed in Franklin County
 St. John's Church (Chuckatuck, Virginia), NRHP-listed in Virginia
 St. John's Church (Chula, Virginia), NRHP-listed in Amelia County
 St. John's Episcopal Church (Hampton, Virginia), listed on the NRHP in Virginia
 Saint John's Episcopal Church (Petersburg, Virginia)
 St. John's Episcopal Church (Richmond, Virginia), NRHP-listed in Virginia
 St. John's Episcopal Church (Roanoke, Virginia), NRHP-listed in Virginia
 St. John's Church (Sweet Hall, Virginia), NRHP-listed in King William County
 St. John's Episcopal Church (Wytheville, Virginia), NRHP-listed in Virginia

 St. John's Episcopal Church, Georgetown, in Washington, D.C.
 St. John's Episcopal Church, Lafayette Square, NRHP-listed in Washington, D.C.
 St. John's Episcopal Church (Olympia, Washington)
 St. John's Episcopal Church (Sparta, Wisconsin), NRHP-listed in Monroe County
 St. John's Episcopal Church (Charleston, West Virginia), NRHP-listed in Kanawha County
 St. John's Episcopal Church and Rectory (Jackson, Wyoming), NRHP-listed in Teton County

Rest of the world
 St. John's Episcopal Church, Edinburgh, Scotland
 St. John's Episcopal Church (Christiansted, U.S. Virgin Islands)

See also
St. John's Church (disambiguation)